The Final Edition is a 1932 American crime drama film directed by Howard Higgin and starring Pat O'Brien, Mae Clark and Morgan Wallace. Made by Columbia Pictures, it is based on a story by Roy Chanslor.

Synopsis
The squabbling city editor and a hotshot female reporter eventually join forces to try and bring down a major crime syndicate, responsible for the murder of the new police commissioner.

Cast
 Pat O'Brien as Sam 'Brad' Bradshaw
 Mae Clarke as Ann Woodman
 Morgan Wallace as Neil Selby
 Bradley Page as Sid Malvern
 Mary Doran as Patsy King
 James Donlan as Freddie
 Phil Tead as Dan Cameron - Reporter
 Robert Emmett O'Connor as Police Lieutenant Daniels
 Bertha Mann as Jane Conroy
 Wallis Clark as Police Commissioner Jim Conroy
 Lydia Knott as Jim Conroy's Mother
 Bill Elliott as Reporter
 Harry Holman as Harry - Newspaperman
 Hal Price as Dave - Bradshaw's Assistant
 Harry Strang as First Selby Hood
 Kit Guard as Second Selby Hood

References

Bibliography
 Langman, Larry. The Media in the Movies: A Catalog of American Journalism Films, 1900-1996. McFarland & Company, 1998.

External links

1932 films
Columbia Pictures films
American crime drama films
American black-and-white films
1932 crime drama films
Films directed by Howard Higgin
Films about journalism
1930s English-language films
1930s American films